Ptyas is a genus of colubrid snakes. This genus is one of several colubrid genera colloquially called "rat snakes" or "ratsnakes".

The generic name derives from Ancient Greek πτυάς, meaning "spitter", which referred to a kind of snake believed to spit venom in the eyes of humans, although in reality none of the Ptyas are known to spit venom.

Species 
13 species are recognized:
 Ptyas carinata (Günther, 1858) – king korros
 Ptyas dhumnades (Cantor, 1842) – Cantor's rat snake
 Ptyas dipsas (Schlegel, 1837)
 Ptyas doriae Boulenger, 1888 – Doria's green snake
 Ptyas fusca (Günther, 1858)
 Ptyas herminae (Boettger, 1895) – Sakishima green snake
 Ptyas korros (Schlegel, 1837) – Chinese ratsnake, Indo-Chinese ratsnake
 Ptyas luzonensis (Günther, 1873)
 Ptyas major (Günther, 1858) – Greater green snake
 Ptyas mucosa (Linnaeus, 1758) – Oriental ratsnake, dhaman
 Ptyas multicincta (Roux, 1907) – Many-banded green snake, North China green snake
 Ptyas nigromarginata (Blyth, 1854) – green ratsnake
 Ptyas semicarinata (Hallowell, 1861) – Ryukyu green snake

References

Further reading 
 Fitzinger, L. 1843. Systema Reptilium, Fasciculus Primus, Amblyglossae. Braumüller & Seidel. Vienna. 106 pp. + indices. (Ptyas, p. 26.)

Colubrids
Snake genera
Taxa named by Leopold Fitzinger